Health in Romania is a level that concerns health status where it's affected by factors including universal healthcare, risk factors and culture.

Diseases 
The main causes of death in 2004 in Romania were cardiovascular disease (62%), followed by malignant tumors (17%), digestive diseases (6%), accidents, injuries and poisoning (5%), and respiratory diseases (5%). Deaths from external causes and from infectious and parasitic diseases are more common in Romania (4–5%) than in other EU member states. It is estimated that a fifth of the total population of Romania suffers from a communicable or chronic disease.

There were 17,283 people with tuberculosis in 2008. The mortality rate is 31.8 people per 1,000 infected citizens. Some statistics show that 30,000 people have been infected with tuberculosis, making it the third-highest rate among countries in Eastern Europe.

Approximately 3.7% of the total population of Romania is either a carrier or affected by hepatitis.

Less than 1% of the total population of Romania is a carrier or infected with HIV. The most common cause of getting HIV is sharing needles. The first case of AIDS in Romania was diagnosed in 1985, and in 1989 cases have been reported in children. Between 1985 and 2014 were reported 19,906 cases, 6,540 deaths, respectively (468 new cases per year).

Romania had the fifth-highest mortality in Europe, at 691 per 100,000 population, and the fourth-highest death rate from communicable diseases in 2015.

Risk Factors 
Romania has significant issues with binge drinking, smoking and obesity.

See also 
 Healthcare in Romania
 COVID-19 pandemic in Romania

References